Kohanda is a village of Azamgarh, Uttar Pradesh.

Villages in Azamgarh district